Palliser Bay is at the southern end of the North Island of New Zealand, to the southeast of Wellington. It runs for 40 kilometres along the Cook Strait coast from Turakirae Head at the southern end of the Remutaka Ranges to Cape Palliser, the North Island's southernmost point. The coastline is exposed to the weather and winds.

Inland from the bay is the plain of the Ruamahanga River, which has its outflow in the bay. This river flows through Lake Wairarapa, 10 kilometres from the coast.

There are several notable geographical features in the area, including the Putangirua Pinnacles, Kupe's Sail and the Whatarangi Bluff, the erosion of which has had dramatic effects on the coastline. Some of these cliffs are made of mudstone and are therefore easily eroded, and sometimes collapse.

References

External links

Te Ara - article on the Palliser Bay area

Bays of the Wellington Region
Cook Strait